

Group A

Head coach: Rashed Al-Badwawi

Head coach: José Valladares

Head coach: Alexandre Gallo

Head coach: Ladislav Pecko

Group B

Head coach: Fabián Coito

Head coach:  Darren Bazeley

Head coach: Ibrahima Kamara

Head coach: Daniele Zoratto

Group C

Head coach: Ivan Gudelj

Head coach: Abdellah Idrissi

Head coach: Jorge Dely Valdés

Head coach: Dilshod Nuraliev

Group D

Head coach: Abdelhay Ben Soltane

Head coach: Rafael Dudamel

Head coach:  Dmitri Khomukha

Head coach: Hirofumi Yoshitake

Group E

Head coach: Sean Fleming

Head coach: Hermann Stadler

Head coach: Ali Doustimehr

Head coach: Humberto Grondona

Group F

Head coach: Raúl Gutiérrez

Head coach: Manu Garba

Head coach: Muwafaq Hussein

Head coach: Roland Larsson

References

External links 
Official Players List

FIFA U-17 World Cup squads